Marlon Reis (born July 1, 1981) is an American animal rights advocate, writer, and first gentleman of Colorado as the husband of 43rd governor of Colorado Jared Polis. He became the first same-sex first gentleman in the United States following the inauguration of Polis as governor on January 8, 2019.

Early life and education 
Reis was born in Boulder, Colorado, to a Jewish family from the East Coast. He earned a bachelor's degree from the University of Colorado at Boulder.

First Gentleman of Colorado
Reis became the first gentleman of Colorado on January 8, 2019, following the inauguration of his partner as governor of Colorado. Polis introduced Reis as the "first-first man" on election night. He served as an unofficial adviser to his partner's gubernatorial campaign for governor. As first gentleman, he has focused on animal rights and welfare, environmental and civil rights, and LGBT rights. 

In addition to being first gentleman, Reis is a writer and has published his works in USA Today, CNN, and The Washington Post.

Personal life 
Reis met future U.S. representative and Colorado governor Jared Polis in 2002 while finishing his education. He and Polis married in September 2021 following an 18-year relationship. He and Polis have two children, born in 2011 and 2014, respectively. He is the son-in-law of poet Susan Polis Schutz and illustrator Stephen Schutz.

Notes

References

External links 
Marlon Reis – Office of Governor Jared Polis
Marlon Reis – National Governors Association

Living people
1981 births
American male journalists
American male non-fiction writers
First Ladies and Gentlemen of Colorado
People from Boulder, Colorado
Animal welfare workers
American environmentalists
American civil rights activists
American LGBT rights activists
American gay writers
LGBT Jews
LGBT people from Colorado
Jewish American people in Colorado politics
Jewish American journalists